The 1947 World Table Tennis Championships men's doubles was the 14th edition of the men's doubles championship.
Bohumil Váňa and Adolf Šlár won the title after defeating Johnny Leach and Jack Carrington in the final by three sets to nil.

Results

See also
List of World Table Tennis Championships medalists

References

-